The Battle of Lake Borgne was a coastal engagement between the Royal Navy and the U.S. Navy in the American South theatre of the War of 1812. It occurred on December 14, 1814 on Lake Borgne. The British victory allowed them to disembark their troops unhindered nine days later and to launch an offensive upon New Orleans on land.

Background
In August 1814, Vice Admiral Cochrane had convinced the Admiralty that a campaign against New Orleans would weaken American resolve against Canada, and hasten a successful end to the war. In the winter of 1814, the British had the objective of gaining control of the entrance of the Mississippi, and to challenge the legality of the Louisiana Purchase. To this end, an expeditionary force of about 8,000 troops under General Edward Pakenham had arrived in the Gulf Coast, to attack New Orleans. An anonymous letter sent from Pensacola, dated December 5 and addressed to Commodore Daniel Patterson warned him of this imminent threat, and was received on December 7. Patterson dispatched Lieutenant Thomas ap Catesby Jones and a small flotilla to wait outside of the Rigolets heading eastward, towards the passes Mariana and Christiana (marked on Lossing's map, close to Cat Island), to watch the movements of the British vessels.

The American force consisted of five Jeffersonian gunboats - No. 156, No. 163, No. 5, No. 23, and No. 162 - the schooner USS Sea Horse with Sailing-Master Johnson commanding, and a sloop-of-war, USS Alligator, serving as a tender. Gunboat No. 156, the flagship of the squadron, mounted one long 24-pounder, four 12-pounder carronades, and four swivel guns. She had a crew of over forty men.

Vice Admiral Sir Alexander Cochrane, British Commander-in-Chief of the North American Station, ordered HMS Seahorse, Armide and Sophie from Pensacola to the anchorage within Ship Island (Mississippi). On December 8, the three British vessels reported that as they passed Cat Island, Mississippi, two American gunboats had fired at them. Furthermore, lookouts on the masts had seen three more gunboats. It would not be possible to proceed with the disembarkation until this squadron of five gunboats, in the shallow waters of the inlet Lake Borgne, were destroyed.

Cochrane put all the rowboats of the British fleet under the command of Commander Nicholas Lockyer of Sophie, with orders to pursue the American flotilla, in waters too shallow for an attack by a ship of the line. The British deployed forty launches and barges with one 12, 18 or 24 pounder carronade each, two further launches with a long 9 pounder and a long 12 pounder respectively, as well as three unarmed gigs. The force consisted of some 980 sailors and Royal Marines. The largest amount of men embarked in any one of the barges was 31.

Jones's squadron headed back in the direction of the Rigolets, mooring at Bay St Louis on December 10. The following day, they prepared their boats to make an attack. On December 12 the squadron arrived at Cat Island, but found the overwhelming strength of the British would have been disadvantageous to the gunboats, so they returned in the direction of the Rigolets, and the fort at Petit Coquilles. Owing to the strong current, they were only able to get as far as the channel between the mainland and Malheureux island on December 13. Jones had been ordered by Patterson to position his gunboats across Pass Christiana (to the south of the modern day settlement of Ansley, Mississippi), at the mouth of Lake Borgne, then fall back to the Rigolets to make a stand.

At night on December 12, the British rowboats, under Lockyer, set off to enter Lake Borgne, to attack the gunboat squadron. Jones sighted the British rowboats on December 13 at 10:00am believing them to be disembarking troops, advancing in the direction of Pass Christian and then stopping. When he saw their route at 2:00pm, advancing past Pass Christian without stopping, he realized they were heading to attack his gunboats. The shallow waters caused Jones issues, three of his gunboats being in 12 or 18 inches water less than their draught, which was resolved by the flood tide at 3:30pm.

The first contact was with three of Lockyer's launches and the schooner Sea Horse on December 13 at 3:45pm. At 2:00pm she had been sent to remove, or failing that to destroy, a stores dump at Bay St. Louis in order to prevent its capture by British forces. The schooner, with the protection of two land-based 6 pounder cannon, saw off three approaching launches with grapeshot, who initially retired out of range. Sea Horse faced a subsequent rowboat attack with four more launches as reinforcements, commanded by Captain Samuel Roberts of HMS Meteor. This renewed attack was 'repulsed after sustaining for nearly half an hour a very destructive fire.' In the face of superior numbers, the Sea Horse was scuttled and the store was set alight, an explosion occurring at 7:30pm with a large fire being visible thereafter. Jones subsequently confirmed that he had sanctioned Johnson to destroy his schooner to prevent it being captured.

At 8:00pm, Lockyer rested his boat crews, who had been rowing against the flow of the tide.

Battle

After rowing for about thirty-six hours, the British approached the five American vessels drawn up in line abreast to block the channel between Malheureux Island and Point Claire on the mainland. At daybreak, Jones noticed the British rowboats nine miles to the east.  As the British advanced, they spotted Alligator, immediately sent a few rowboats under Roberts to cut her off and the British quickly captured her at 9:30am. At 10 o'clock on the morning of December 14, the British boats had closed to within long gunshot by St. Joseph's Island. At this point Lockyer ordered the boats' crews to breakfast. Lockyer formed the boats into three divisions. He took command of the first, gave Montresor of  command of the second, and Roberts of Meteor command of the third. When the British had finished their breakfast they returned to their oars and pulled up to the line of American gunboats. The main battle came at 10:39 am. The British were rowing against a strong current and under a heavy fire of round and grapeshot.

The American sailors killed or wounded a number of the rowboat crews in the process, including most of the men in Lockyer's boat. Eventually the range closed and the British sailors and marines began to board the American vessels. At 11:50am Lockyer personally boarded Gunboat No. 156, Jones's vessel. Both Lockyer and Jones sustained severe wounds. One rowboat from Tonnant, commanded by Lieutenant James Barnwell Tattnall grappled the gunboat and was sunk, all of its boarding party transferred to the other rowboats. Jones states that at 12:10pm the British captured Gunboat No. 156 and turned her guns against her sister ships. The gunboat fired her broadsides and assisted the capture of the remaining American craft. One by one, the British took the other four American gunboats. The engagement was over at 12:30pm. Lockyer had hypothesised that boarding and capturing the rest of the American flotilla took five minutes, rather than the twenty minutes in Jones's account.

Aftermath

The engagement lasted about two hours, though the actual hand-to-hand combat was short. Whilst the British outnumbered the American seamen, Roosevelt does note the advantage Jones's flotilla had in defense, being stationary, having some long heavy guns and boarding nettings. This was offset by two of the five gunboats (No.156 commanded by Jones, and No.163 commanded by Ulrick) having drifted out of line.

The Americans lost their entire flotilla of five gunboats and crew, of whom 41 were killed or wounded. Lockyer states the five gunboats were each crewed by 45 men, for a total of 225, whereas Jones gives a lower figure for a total of 182 men in the five gunboats. Jones was made a prisoner of war for three months and would later be decorated for his bravery in this engagement. The British casualties were 94 killed and wounded. The casualties were from the following vessels: Tonnant, Norge, Bedford, Royal Oak, Ramillies, Armide, Cydnus, Seahorse, Trave, Sophie, Belle Poule, Gorgon, Meteor. American claims that at least 2 British boats sunk and over 300 casualties were inflicted, as Jones claimed, are disputed.

In all, the six captured vessels of Jones's squadron comprised a loss of 245 men, sixteen long guns, fourteen carronades, two howitzers and twelve swivel guns, as reported by Lockyer. Cochrane rated the captured flotilla as the equivalent of a 36-gun frigate and appointed Lockyer to its command as soon as his wounds permitted. Montresor took command pro tem; in March 1815, Lockyer received promotion to post captain.

The British took the five gunboats into service under the names Ambush (or Ambush No. 5), Firebrand, Destruction,  and Eagle. Several of these vessels remained in Royal Navy service into June 1815, and at least one perhaps beyond. As well as the warships providing men for the boats, there were sailors from the following troopships too: Gorgon, Dictator, Diomede, Alceste, Belle Poule, Hydra, Bucephalus, Fox, Dover, Thames.

Lake Borgne would become the landing zone for British forces preparing to attack New Orleans. After the population of the city learned of the engagement on Lake Borgne, panic overtook some inhabitants of New Orleans; so Andrew Jackson declared martial law on December 15.

The loss of the gunboats meant that Jackson had no means of surveillance of the British, and it is noted that he did not deploy scouts as a substitute. 

One unintended consequence is that the gunboat crews in captivity were able to mislead the British as to Jackson's strength in numbers, when they were questioned.

At the end of January 1815, the prisoners of war were transported to the Caribbean in HMS Ramillies. In February 1815, following news of ratification of the peace treaty,  was sent to Jamaica, to fetch the prisoners taken at Lake Borgne, and to repatriate the prisoners.

Although Jones's squadron never made it as far as the fort at Petit Coquilles, it was decided to improve the coastal defences with the creation of Fort Pike commencing in 1819 to replace the earlier fort. It was the first of three forts to be constructed in Louisiana under the postwar "Third System", along with Fort Jackson, Louisiana and Fort Livingston, Louisiana.

The engagement itself was not referred to as a "battle" in the literature of the 19th century. Hornbrook's painting from the 1840s uses the word 'action' in its title. Secondary sources in the 20th century do refer to the 'Battle of Lake Borgne'.

Medal
In 1847 the Admiralty initiated the Naval General Service Medal. The clasps covered a variety of actions, from boat service to single-ship actions, to larger naval engagements, including major fleet actions. The engagement at Lake Borgne was deemed a boat service worthy enough of recognition by a clasp, and appears on the list of clasps for boat service during the War of 1812. The Admiralty issued a clasp (or bar) marked "14 Dec. Boat Service 1814" to surviving combatants who claimed the clasp.   This was the largest Boat Action for which the Naval General Service Medal was granted. In all, 205 survivors claimed it.

See also
 American South theatre of the War of 1812

Notes and citations
Notes

Citations

Bibliography

External links
 

Lake Borgne
Lake Borgne
History of Louisiana
1814 in Louisiana
December 1814 events
Lake Borgne
Lake Borgne